The Revolutionary Council of Islamic Unity of Afghanistan (Shura-i Engelab-i Ettefaq-i Islami Afghanistan, often called simply Shura) was a Hazara political movement which appeared in Afghanistan in 1979 in opposition to the increasingly leftist Kabul government.  The movement was led by Sayyid Ali Beheshti.

The Shura had both political and militant arms, and removed many Kabul-backed authorities within the Hazarajat (Hazara-populated region of Afghanistan), replacing them with their own functionaries.  By the end of 1983 the Shura controlled 60% of the population of the Hazarajat.

The Shura was the primary Hazara resistance movement part of the Tehran Eight political constellation, followed by the Al-Nasr (Victory) and the Union of Islamic Fighters.

References

Anti-Soviet factions in the Soviet–Afghan War
Conservative parties
Defunct political parties in Afghanistan
Hazara political parties
Political movements in Afghanistan
Revolutionary Council of Islamic Unity of Afghanistan politicians
Shia Islamic political parties in Afghanistan